This is a list of diplomatic missions of Egypt, excluding honorary consulates. Egypt has an extensive global diplomatic presence.

Africa

 Algiers (Embassy)

 Luanda (Embassy)

 Cotonou (Embassy)

 Ouagadougou (Embassy)

 Bujumbura (Embassy)

 Yaoundé (Embassy)

 N'Djamena (Embassy)

 Brazzaville (Embassy)

 Kinshasa (Embassy)

 Djibouti City (Embassy)

 Malabo (Embassy)

 Asmera (Embassy)

 Addis Ababa (Embassy)

 Libreville (Embassy)

 Accra (Embassy)

 Conakry (Embassy)

 Abidjan (Embassy)

 Nairobi (Embassy)

 Monrovia (Embassy)

 Tripoli (Embassy)
 Benghazi (Consulate-General)

 Antananarivo (Embassy)

 Lilongwe (Embassy)

 Bamako (Embassy)

 Nouakchott (Embassy)

 Port Louis (Embassy)

 Rabat (Embassy)

 Maputo (Embassy)

 Windhoek (Embassy)

 Niamey (Embassy)

 Abuja (Embassy)
 Lagos (Consulate-General)

 Kigali (Embassy)

 Dakar (Embassy)

 Freetown (Embassy)

 Mogadishu (Embassy)

 Pretoria (Embassy)

 Juba (Embassy)

 Khartoum (Embassy)
 Port Sudan (Consulate-General)

 Dar es Salaam (Embassy)
 Zanzibar City (Consulate-General)

 Lomé (Embassy)

 Tunis (Embassy)

 Kampala (Embassy)

 Lusaka (Embassy)

 Harare (Embassy)

Americas

 Buenos Aires (Embassy)

 La Paz (Embassy)

 Brasília (Embassy)
 Rio de Janeiro (Consulate-General)

 Ottawa (Embassy)
 Montreal (Consulate-General)

 Santiago (Embassy)

 Bogotá (Embassy)

 Havana (Embassy)

 Quito (Embassy)

 Guatemala City (Embassy)

 Mexico City (Embassy)

 Panama City (Embassy)

 Lima (Embassy)

 Washington, D.C. (Embassy)
 Chicago (Consulate-General)
 Houston (Consulate-General)
 Los Angeles (Consulate-General)
 New York City (Consulate-General)

 Montevideo (Embassy)

 Caracas (Embassy)

Asia

 Yerevan (Embassy)

 Baku (Embassy)

 Manama (Embassy)

 Dhaka (Embassy)

 Beijing (Embassy)
 Hong Kong (Consulate-General)
 Shanghai (Consulate-General)

 New Delhi (Embassy)
 Mumbai (Consulate-General)

 Jakarta (Embassy)

 Tehran (Interests Section)

 Baghdad (Embassy)
 Irbil (Consulate-General)
 Mosul (Consulate-General)

 Tel Aviv (Embassy)
 Eilat (Consulate-General)

 Tokyo (Embassy)

 Amman (Embassy)
 Aqaba (Consulate-General)

 Astana (Embassy)
 Almaty (Consulate-General)

 Kuwait City (Embassy)

 Beirut (Embassy)

 Kuala Lumpur (Embassy)

 Yangon (Embassy)

 Kathmandu (Embassy)

 Pyongyang (Embassy)

 Muscat (Embassy)

 Islamabad (Embassy)

 Ramallah  (Representative Office)
 Gaza City (Representative Office)

 Manila (Embassy)

 Doha (Embassy)

 Riyadh (Embassy)
 Jeddah (Consulate-General)

 Singapore (Embassy)

 Seoul (Embassy)

 Colombo (Embassy)

 Damascus (Embassy)

 Bangkok (Embassy)

 Ankara (Embassy)
 Istanbul (Consulate-General)

 Abu Dhabi (Embassy)
 Dubai (Consulate-General)

 Tashkent (Embassy)

 Hanoi (Embassy)

 Sana'a (Embassy)
 Aden (Consulate)

Europe

Tirana  (Embassy)

 Vienna (Embassy)

 Brussels (Embassy)

 Sarajevo (Embassy)

 Sofia (Embassy)

 Zagreb (Embassy)

 Nicosia (Embassy)

 Prague (Embassy)

 Copenhagen (Embassy)

 Helsinki (Embassy)

 Paris (Embassy)
 Marseille (Consulate-General)

 Berlin (Embassy)
 Frankfurt (Consulate-General)
 Hamburg (Consulate-General)

 Athens (Embassy)

 Rome (Embassy)

 Budapest (Embassy)

 Dublin (Embassy)

 Rome (Embassy)
 Milan (Consulate-General)

 Valletta (Embassy)

 The Hague (Embassy)

 Oslo (Embassy)

 Warsaw (Embassy)

 Lisbon (Embassy)

 Bucharest (Embassy)

 Moscow (Embassy)

 Belgrade (Embassy)

 Bratislava (Embassy)

 Ljubljana (Embassy)

 Madrid (Embassy)

 Stockholm (Embassy)

 Bern (Embassy)
 Geneva (Consulate-General)

 Kyiv (Embassy)

 London (Embassy)

Oceania

 Canberra (Embassy)
 Melbourne (Consulate-General)
 Sydney (Consulate-General)

 Wellington (Embassy)

Multilateral organizations
 African Union
Addis Ababa (Permanent Mission to the African Union)
 Food and Agriculture Organization
Rome (Permanent Mission the FAO)

Brussels (Mission to the European Union)

 Geneva (Permanent Mission to the United Nations and other international organizations)
 New York (Permanent Mission to the United Nations)
 Nairobi (Permanent Mission to the United Nations and other international organizations)
 Vienna (Permanent Mission the United Nations)

 Paris (Permanent Mission to UNESCO)

Gallery

Accredited embassies 
  (Yaounde)
  (Dakar)
  (Caracas)
  (Nur-Sultan)
  (Colombo)
  (Jakarta)
  (Moscow)
  (Moscow)
  (Wellington)
  (Caracas)

See also

 Foreign relations of Egypt
 Attack on the Egyptian Embassy in Pakistan

Notes

References

 Ministry of Foreign Affairs of Egypt

 
Egypt
Diplomatic missions